The Ducati Desmosedici RR is a limited production road-legal version of the Desmosedici MotoGP racebike.

In 2004, Ducati announced at the Misano circuit at the World Ducati Week that a low volume road replica of the Desmosedici would be available for reservations beginning in June 2006. With Ducati making 1,500 Desmosedici models for public purchase.

Ducati first showed a final production version of the bike at a press day for the '06 Italian Grand Prix at Mugello. Termed the Desmosedici RR (Racing Replica), it was claimed to be the first true road replica of a MotoGP racing bike. The price included a three-year warranty and servicing, cover, and a racing kit including a race-only exhaust system, a slip-on muffler, and complementary fuel and ignition mapping in a "race ECU". It also included enough sponsor stickers to fill both sides of the bike. With forged magnesium wheels the Desmosedici RR was the first Ducati production bike to use them. 
Aprilia used them in 2002 on their limited edition RSV Mille SP 
The Ducati Desmosedici RR production started beginning in October 2007 till December 2008, and the first customer orders delivered from January 2008.

See also
List of fastest production motorcycles by acceleration

References

External links 

Ducati.com - The official manufacturer's website. Current model info, including online information, history, manuals and race team info (Italian/English)
Pierre Col's Desmosedici RR photos - 23,000 km in less than 3 years on road and tracks in France

Desmosedici RR
Sport bikes
Motorcycles introduced in 2007